Hong Kong–Switzerland relations refers to international relations between Hong Kong and Switzerland.

History

Switzerland's first presence in Hong Kong could be traced back to Theodor Jost, the first Apostolic Prefect of Hong Kong, as long ago as 1842. Since the beginning of the 20th century, Swiss businessmen, as well as Catholic and Protestant missionaries – most of them from the Basel Mission – settled in Hong Kong.

Diplomatic missions
The Consulate General of Switzerland in Hong Kong is Switzerland's official representation in Hong Kong, while the Hong Kong Economic and Trade Office, Berlin represents Hong Kong in eight Central European countries, including Switzerland. The Hong Kong Economic and Trade Office, Geneva is mostly responsible for the WTO, the ISO, the Trade Committee of the OECD and the WMO.

Trade
The two entities have developed a significant trading partnership. Hong Kong is Switzerland's third largest export destination (7.8%), only after Germany (16%) and United States (10%). As at 2016, Switzerland is Hong Kong's 15th largest trading partner in the world. The total trade between the two places amounted to EUR 9.6 billion in 2016. A number of Swiss banks have established operations in Hong Kong since the 1960s, mainly due to the fact of Hong Kong's prominent role as a financial centre. Hong Kong's major export to Switzerland was jewellery (71.2%) while major Swiss exports to Hong Kong are watches and clocks (40.5%) and jewellery (19.3%).

High level visits
From Switzerland, in July 2016, Mr Jorg Gasser, the State Secretary of the Swiss State Secretariat for International Financial Matters, visited Hong Kong. Dr Michael Ambühl, the State Secretary of the Swiss State Secretariat for International Financial Matters visited Hong Kong in July 2013.

From Hong Kong, Secretary for Commerce and Economic Development, Gregory So, visited Switzerland twice in December 2016 and January 2017. In December 2016, the Secretary for Security, Lai Tung-kwok, visited Switzerland and met with officials at the federal level responsible for refugee matters. In November 2014, the Secretary for Education, Eddie Ng visited Switzerland to look into the vocational education systems and young persons’ career development.

Residents
As at 2013, 2064 Swiss nationals reside in Hong Kong.

References

External links
Consulate General of Switzerland in Hong Kong

Switzerland
Hong Kong